In mathematics, specifically abstract algebra, the isomorphism theorems (also known as Noether's isomorphism theorems) are theorems that describe the relationship between quotients, homomorphisms, and subobjects.  Versions of the theorems exist for groups, rings, vector spaces, modules, Lie algebras, and various other algebraic structures.  In universal algebra, the isomorphism theorems can be generalized to the context of algebras and congruences.

History 
The isomorphism theorems were formulated in some generality for homomorphisms of modules by Emmy Noether in her paper Abstrakter Aufbau der Idealtheorie in algebraischen Zahl- und Funktionenkörpern, which was published in 1927 in Mathematische Annalen.  Less general versions of these theorems can be found in work of Richard Dedekind and previous papers by Noether.

Three years later, B.L. van der Waerden published his influential Moderne Algebra the first abstract algebra textbook that took the groups-rings-fields approach to the subject. Van der Waerden credited lectures by Noether on group theory and Emil Artin on algebra, as well as a seminar conducted by Artin, Wilhelm Blaschke, Otto Schreier, and van der Waerden himself on ideals as the main references. The three isomorphism theorems, called homomorphism theorem, and two laws of isomorphism when applied to groups, appear explicitly.

Groups 
We first present the isomorphism theorems of the groups.

Note on numbers and names 
Below we present four theorems, labelled A, B, C and D. They are often numbered as "First isomorphism theorem", "Second..." and so on; however, there is no universal agreement on the numbering. Here we give some examples of the group isomorphism theorems in the literature. Notice that these theorems have analogs for rings and modules.

It is less common to include the Theorem D, usually known as the lattice theorem or the correspondence theorem, as one of isomorphism theorems, but when included, it is the last one.

Statement of the theorems

Theorem A (groups)

Let G and H be groups, and let f : G → H be a homomorphism.  Then:
 The kernel of f is a normal subgroup of G,
 The image of f is a subgroup of H, and
 The image of f is isomorphic to the quotient group G / ker(f).
In particular, if f is surjective then H is isomorphic to G / ker(f).

Theorem B (groups)

Let  be a group. Then the following hold:

This theorem is sometimes called the isomorphism theorem, diamond theorem or the parallelogram theorem.

Then the second isomorphism theorem states that:

Theorem C (groups)
Then

Theorem D (groups)

The correspondence theorem (also known as the lattice theorem) is sometimes called the third or fourth isomorphism theorem.

The Zassenhaus lemma (also known as the butterfly lemma) is sometimes called the fourth isomorphism theorem.

Discussion 

The first isomorphism theorem can be expressed in category theoretical language by saying that the category of groups is (normal epi, mono)-factorizable; in other words, the normal epimorphisms and the monomorphisms form a factorization system for the category. This is captured in the commutative diagram in the margin, which shows the objects and morphisms whose existence can be deduced from the morphism . The diagram shows that every morphism in the category of groups has a kernel in the category theoretical sense; the arbitrary morphism f factors into , where ι is a monomorphism and π is an epimorphism (in a conormal category, all epimorphisms are normal). This is represented in the diagram by an object  and a monomorphism  (kernels are always monomorphisms), which complete the short exact sequence running from the lower left to the upper right of the diagram.

If the sequence is right split (i.e., there is a morphism σ that maps  to a -preimage of itself), then G is the semidirect product of the normal subgroup  and the subgroup . In an abelian category, all monomorphisms are also normal, and the diagram may be extended by a second short exact sequence .

In the second isomorphism theorem, the product SN is the join of S and N in the lattice of subgroups of G, while the intersection S ∩ N is the meet.

The third isomorphism theorem is generalized by the nine lemma to abelian categories and more general maps between objects.

Rings 
The statements of the theorems for rings are similar, with the notion of a normal subgroup replaced by the notion of an ideal.

Theorem A (rings) 
Let R and S be rings, and let φ : R → S be a ring homomorphism.  Then:
 The kernel of φ is an ideal of R,
 The image of φ is a subring of S, and
 The image of φ is isomorphic to the quotient ring R / ker(φ).
In particular, if φ is surjective then S is isomorphic to R / ker(φ).

Theorem B (rings) 
Let R be a ring.  Let S be a subring of R, and let I be an ideal of R.  Then:
 The sum S + I = {s + i | s ∈ S, i ∈ I } is a subring of R,
 The intersection S ∩ I is an ideal of S, and
 The quotient rings (S + I) / I and S / (S ∩ I) are isomorphic.

Theorem C (rings)
Let R be a ring, and I an ideal of R.  Then

Theorem D (rings)

Modules 
The statements of the isomorphism theorems for modules are particularly simple, since it is possible to form a quotient module from any submodule.  The isomorphism theorems for vector spaces (modules over a field) and abelian groups (modules over ) are special cases of these.  For finite-dimensional vector spaces, all of these theorems follow from the rank–nullity theorem.

In the following, "module" will mean "R-module" for some fixed ring R.

Theorem A (modules) 
Let M and N be modules, and let φ : M → N be a module homomorphism.  Then:
 The kernel of φ is a submodule of M,
 The image of φ is a submodule of N, and
 The image of φ is isomorphic to the quotient module M / ker(φ).
In particular, if φ is surjective then N is isomorphic to M / ker(φ).

Theorem B (modules)
Let M be a module, and let S and T be submodules of M.  Then:
 The sum S + T = {s + t | s ∈ S, t ∈ T} is a submodule of M,
 The intersection S ∩ T is a submodule of M, and
 The quotient modules (S + T) / T and S / (S ∩ T) are isomorphic.

Theorem C (modules) 
Let M be a module, T a submodule of M.

Theorem D (modules)

Universal algebra 
To generalise this to universal algebra, normal subgroups need to be replaced by congruence relations.

A congruence on an algebra  is an equivalence relation  that forms a subalgebra of  considered as an algebra with componentwise operations. The resulting structure is the quotient algebra.

Theorem A (universal algebra)
Let  be an algebra homomorphism. (Note that in the case of a group,  iff , so one recovers the notion of kernel used in group theory in this case.)

Theorem B (universal algebra)
Then
 the algebra  is isomorphic to the algebra .

Theorem C (universal algebra) 
Let  be an algebra and  two congruence relations on  such that .

Theorem D (universal algebra) 
The set
 is a complete lattice ordered by inclusion.
the map   is a lattice isomorphism.

Note

References 
 Emmy Noether, Abstrakter Aufbau der Idealtheorie in algebraischen Zahl- und Funktionenkörpern, Mathematische Annalen 96  (1927) pp. 26–61
 Colin McLarty, "Emmy Noether's 'Set Theoretic' Topology: From Dedekind to the rise of functors". The Architecture of Modern Mathematics: Essays in history and philosophy (edited by Jeremy Gray and José Ferreirós), Oxford University Press (2006) pp. 211–35.
 
 Paul M. Cohn, Universal algebra, Chapter II.3 p. 57